Animesh Chakravorty FNA, FASc (born 30 June 1935) is a Bengali Indian inorganic chemist. In 1975, he was awarded the Shanti Swarup Bhatnagar Prize for Science and Technology in chemistry by the Council of Scientific and Industrial Research.

Early life and education
The eldest of six children, Chakravorty was born in Mymensingh to Dr. Jogendra Chandra Chakravorty, a general practitioner and eye specialist, and his wife Tarubala. From an early age, his father inspired him towards a scientific career. Chakravorty received his early education in the city's Edward School, followed by studies at the Mrityunjoy School. Following the independence and partition of India, his family remained in what had become the Pakistani province of East Bengal until 1949, when they left Mymensingh for Calcutta. Chakravorty completed his secondary education at the Mitra Institution and was admitted to the Scottish Church College in 1950, from which he took his Intermediate in Science in 1952, followed by an honours degree in chemistry. 

Admitted to the University College of Science of the University of Calcutta for his master's degree in chemistry, Chakravorty was inspired by new developments in inorganic chemistry, including quantum bonding theories and new analytical techniques such as spectroscopy. After completing his master's degree in 1957, he taught undergraduate chemistry at Maharaja Manindra Chandra College and at Vidyasagar College. Joining the research group of noted polymer chemist Sadhan Basu for his doctorate, under Basu's supervision Chakravorty determined the single-crystal spectra of certain complexes of copper, nickel and chromium in polarized visible light and interpreted the spectra in terms of ligand field theory. Chakravorty and Basu published their findings in three papers in Nature and the Journal of Chemical Physics during 1959–60; the two communications in Nature concerned tetragonal copper complexes, while the communication in the Journal of Chemical Physics discussed the spectra of chromium tris-acetylacetone. The papers formed the basis of Chakravorty's dissertation, for which he received his Ph.D. in 1961. After submitting his dissertation, Chakravorty conducted some independent studies with a fellow classmate, a doctoral candidate in colloid chemistry, resulting in a paper on charge-transfer spectra of gold complexes which was published in the Journal of Chemical Physics. The gold for the research came from broken ornaments donated by his mother.

Career
Offered postdoctoral fellowships by Geoffrey Wilkinson at Imperial College London and by Wilkinson's student F. Albert Cotton at MIT, Chakravorty joined Cotton's research group in late September 1961, in which he researched solution stability constants and structures of 3D metal complexes of imidazole derivatives. The following year, upon the suggestion of Cotton, he moved to Harvard for a second postdoc with Cotton's student Richard H. Holm; as Holm's only postdoc, he worked on stereo-labile nickel complexes. In December 1964, he joined the faculty of the Indian Institute of Technology Kanpur, where he and his research group studied synthetic and stereochemical
problems of new types of complexes, and were soon noted for specializing in redox phenomena and oxidation-state manipulation. Eventually appointed head of chemistry at IIT Kanpur, Chakravorty joined the Indian Association for the Cultivation of Science (IACS) in Kolkata as head of inorganic chemistry in June 1977. Over the following three decades, beginning with Akhil Ranjan Chakravarty, he guided 58 doctoral students, including after his formal retirement from IACS as an emeritus professor in 2000; his last doctoral student submitted his dissertation in 2006. Chakravorty has published over 300 research papers, 20 review articles and several chapters.

Prizes and honours
Shanti Swarup Bhatnagar Prize for Science and Technology
TWAS Prize
Honorary doctorate, DSc honoris causa, University of Burdwan
Indian National Science Academy Golden Jubilee Research Professorship

References

External links
 Indian Association for the Cultivation of Science (IACS)

1935 births
Living people
Scottish Church College alumni
University of Calcutta alumni
Academic staff of the University of Calcutta
Academic staff of IIT Kanpur
Texas A&M University faculty
Recipients of the Shanti Swarup Bhatnagar Award in Engineering Science
Fellows of the Indian National Science Academy
20th-century Indian chemists
Scientists from Kolkata
TWAS laureates
People from Mymensingh